Majeed Marhoon (1945–2010) was a Bahraini saxophonist, and a former leftist political activist with the National Liberation Front of Bahrain. He spent 22 years in prison in Bahrain between 1968 and 1990, accused of planting a bomb in the car of a British intelligence officer of 21 March 1966. Seventeen of his years in captivity were spent at the Jidda Island prison, four of those years in solitary confinement.

He claims to have been tortured in prison under the orders of British officer Ian Henderson.

At the Addaama neighborhood in Hoora – Bahrain, the neighborhood of the simple and the deprived, Majeed Marhoon was born on the hot afternoon of 17 August 1945.

Majeed says that his birth was one week after the second bombing of Japan by the American forces and the heat that day was extreme due to the spreading of atomic dust in the ozone layer.

Majeed faced the bitterness of life and poverty by excelling in school," I was one of the best students in the school despite the hardships of living, at times we used to go to bed with empty stomachs. In 1953, I was transferred to Gudaibiya elementary school before it was fully constructed. In that school I noticed the social differences between classes, and I used to isolate myself trying to think and find reasons, but of no use, because the issue was bigger than my mind could handle. "Says Majeed.

In the academic year 1956, Majeed was asked by his arts and sports teacher, Mr. Salman Majid Al-Dallaal, to compose the music for a monologue of a school play. This was the first of Majeed's musical compositions; he was only ten years old when he composed this monologue which was broadcast on Radio Bahrain.

Every night, before he goes to bed, Majeed would listen to Radio Dhahran on an old radio that works on a dry battery. Radio Dhahran used to broadcast music 24 hours a day.

This boy was to become talented, addicted to symphony music that was rich in its diverse harmonies, even though he was unable to comprehend it completely at such an early age.

This triggered his curiosity and posed a real challenge for him to know more and motivated him towards persistence and hard work to enter the magical world of music.

After elementary school, Majeed was transferred to Bapco (Bahrain petroleum company) Training School, since being affiliated to this school ensured an income. This helped him and his family to move out from the house they rented to a better home.

This income also helped him achieve his long-lasting desire to buy a musical instrument. In 1959 he bought a harmonica and along with it a book to learn how to play it.

Understanding the lessons theoretically was not tough on him, but how to implement them was the problem, especially since his knowledge of English language was very limited at the time. He almost lost hope because his first attempts to learn the notes were a failure.

He then decided to overcome that by learning to play by ear, he used to go out at night to the sea shore behind Gudaibiya Palace to play out what filled his mind and heart, the view of the reflection of the moon on the dancing sea waves triggered his emotions.

This youth born for music was also vowed to struggle. In those beautiful times, the creative ones always found themselves biased towards the cause of their people, and the progressive route expressed that yearning for freedom.

This would lead him to reading novels and literature of George Hanna, Salama Moussa, Mohammed Mandour and Maxim Gorki. The stories and novels of the latter had a deep impact on Majeed because he found in the characters of those stories live impersonations he related to in real life.

In a short while, the realization came to Majeed that the Socialist ideas and directions were closest to his mind and heart. That was when he was asked if he would be interested in joining the National Liberation Front, Majeed says, "Without hesitation, I revealed my desire and eagerness to join it!"

In 1961, he was asked by the late Baqer Kalbarham to start a music group to play at the forefront of Kalbarham's Azza* procession during the lunar month of Muharram, since he was one of the most popular musicians among the poor at the time. With great enthusiasm, Majeed took up the task.

At this stage, the consciousness of the meeting point between art and music with the ideas of change got defined within him. This realization enhanced his stance that music is a means to transcend with the taste of the human being and discipline his soul. His musical skills had been improving, and other instruments started luring him into their world.

In 1961, he bought the saxophone after being introduced to wind instruments like the trumpet and the clarinet.

According to the late artist Ahmed Jamal, who owned a music instruments and books shop, Majeed was the first in Bahrain to buy a saxophone and a book with it to learn how to play, and he did with no help from any teacher or instructor.

Majeed joined the Amateur Musicians Family in late 1963 for six months, during which he participated in various concerts and events organized by many clubs, but his membership there didn't take long for him to later become one of the founders of Al-Anwar Group.

His musical and artistic knowledge continued to grow and develop and his saxophone playing skills have been improving significantly, he began to play French music which widened his artistic capabilities. He also played African, Latin American, English music (like The Beatles), Spanish and Russian; even though he was unable to continue studying music in a methodological manner.

In 1967, the lyrics of the anthem "Tareequna anta tadri shawkon wa wa'aron Aseer" (Our path, you know, rugged, hard and filled with thorns) was discussed for the first time. Even though Majeed didn't get the full lyrics, but the first verses attracted his attention, so he composed the music. These lyrics would be enriched years later by the poet Ahmed Al-Shamlan, and at a later stage the artist Salman Zaiman would add a few more verses too.

In 1966, Majeed would execute a heroic operation against the militants of British colonization, of which his role would remain a secret until 1969. He was then led to a mock trial which only lasted for half an hour, where the prior issued sentence was revealed. He was given a life sentence.

He was then transferred to the island of Jidah. The island seemed very scary at first, because it was nothing like the other islands of Bahrain, there were mountainous plateaus, caves and everything that brings fear to a newcomer.

In 1973, Majeed's attempts to convince the prison warden to get some music books in order for him to study during his free time succeeded. As soon as he had those books in his possession he began studying seriously and intensively making the best out of the isolated atmosphere he was in, taking inspiration from his musical experiments, going back to everything he had learnt with great concentration. He recomposed "Memories" on the note. Even though "Memories" wasn't his first experience in composition, but it was a turning point in his career as a musician, he then composed "Haneen". And after reading 'The Hunchback of Notre dame' came the piece "Esmeralda" expressing the great influence the works of Victor Hugo had on him, especially since his romantic musical directions were going in parallel to those of the novel.

He was also very influenced by the music of Hayden and Mozart; but most of all: Beethoven. Majeed found his soul as a music composer in Beethoven; he says Beethoven was just like him a deaf self-taught musician who also had revolutionary ideas; opposed the authority of the Lords and despised ingratiation.

He was very interested in the works of Al-Rahbani Brothers. He performed their music and benefited from it a lot in many of his pieces including his piece "The Island of Dreams" which embodies the dreams, hopes aspirations and pain of many of the prisoners including himself.

Specialized musicians from the Royal Swedish Academy of Music studied some of his work and ranked him at the level of high professionals. From then on, the world's recognition of Majeed as a freedom fighter and as an artist continued.

In the 80's during one of the largest campaigns to demand his freedom, two of Majeed's compositions – "Memories" and "Nostalgia" – were played by the German Radio Symphony Orchestra to be heard by the progressive world and bring its attention to his talent and suffering.

In 1985 at the World Festival of Youth and Students in Moscow, thousands of protesting cards were signed by the representatives of the Democratic Youth Against Colonization Movement from all over the world demanding his immediate release. Majeed wrote at that moment: "For the first time in my life, I've tasted the sweetness of the great victory!"

The passing of his mother had a great impact on Majeed, his great sorrow flooded out in the form of captivating musical pieces like "The song of the departed" which he composed ten days after her death, or like "The burning of the heart" that he composed after four days of her death and completed in one session only. It was played later by Dr. Weiry Deen, a music Professor at the University of Utah.

Majeed says that his outcome of his musical compositions was based on deep self-analysis and extreme strict self-criticism leading him to complete his second symphony "An invitation to Joy" on his fortieth birthday on 17 August 1985.

By that time, Majeed had made a firm decision that his future was in music alone, not in any other field, therefore he got himself more indulged in studying harmony, music distribution and music composition on a strict scientific basis.

He was able during that time to obtain a small tape player and some cassettes on which he recorded some music works like Tchaikovsky and Beethoven which quenched some of his thirst and passion for music and helped him move on in his project. He composed some valuable pieces like The Piano Sonata and The First String Quartet; he also worked on completing his second symphony in which he avoided making the same mistakes of his first.

During that period he also composed The Second String Quartet which was played later by the Adembra String Quartet Group on the International Music Day in 1999 gaining remarkable success.

Majeed had turned the island of Jida into a laboratory for creative musical experiments, since the 70s he had begun teaching music to some fellow prisoners and later forming a humble music group after a few musical instruments were provided.

On 8 January 1986, Majeed was transferred from Jida to the prison of Jaww. According to Majeed this transfer came with some advantages helping him with his musical project. He was placed in a private cell which he used as a music school and library with a table and a chair making it easier for him to sit and compose his music whenever he pleased.

On 26 April 1990, Majeed completed his life sentence to finally breathe the air of freedom. From his first day out of prison, Majeed got affiliated to Ajras Musical Band as a composer and a musician. Among his works with Ajras was the song "Habeebati" (My Darling) which was performed at the 3rd Ajras concert; and also the composition, "An invitation to affection".

Majeed continued working with immense concentration and passion on his music and also to complete writing "The Modern Music Dictionary" on which he was working since 1975 in prison. He then revised the first volume and included additions to the entries and footnotes, mostly on the connection between the computer and music. He devoted himself for the first volume from 1990–2002, which is released today.-- 16 March 2008.

Majeed died on 23 February 2010 because of sickness.

See also
 March Intifada
 National Liberation Front of Bahrain

References
 In memoriam to Majeed Marhoon
 “Bahrain’s Mandela” dies - Habib Toumi, Gulf News
 Tribute to Majeed Marhoon - Abdulhadi Khalaf, Alwaqt Newspaper, 11 December 2007
 Majeed Marhoon - Hassan Madan, Civilized Dialogue, 19 December 2007
 Glory to you, O Saxophonist - Khalil Zainal, Civilized Dialogue, 20 October 2003
 Testimonies of Torture Victims in Bahrain

1945 births
2010 deaths
Bahraini dissidents
Bahraini left-wing activists
Bahraini musicians
Bahraini prisoners and detainees
Prisoners and detainees of Bahrain
Saxophonists
Republicanism in Bahrain
20th-century saxophonists